Gerd Walter Christian Sommerhoff OBE (1915-2002) was a pioneer and lifelong advancer of theoretical neuroscience and a noted humanist.

Early life and family
Sommerhoff and his twin sister were born in Wiesbaden, Germany, to Elizabeth Ruher and Walter Georg Sommerhoff, a wealthy banker who was born in New York to Elise Schumann, the second child of Robert and Clara Schumann. Sommerhoff was a great-grandson of the German composers Robert Schumann and his wife Clara. The Sommerhoff family resided in Haarlem, Netherlands, until the loss of the family fortune in the Wall Street crash and the death of their father "in compromising circumstances". The two younger children moved to Ryde on the Isle of Wight in 1931 with their mother Elizabeth Sommerhoff when she married Major Bernard Francis Anne Vernon-Harcourt, while their elder brother, Walter Hans Sommerhoff, emigrated to Santiago, Chile. Sommerhoff studied engineering at Zurich Polytechnic (now ETH Zurich) and philosophy, politics and economics at Oxford University. Gerd was interned in as an enemy alien Canada until 1942.

Career 
Upon release from internment, Sommerhoff taught science at the Dragon School. While there, he used boxes of numbered cards, containing questions, answers, tutorial material, or descriptions of experiments, on a variety of different subjects. He presented science programmes for the BBC from 1960–1962 before being recruited to Sevenoaks School in 1963 by headmaster Kim Taylor.  Some of his students were Tim Hunt, and Alan Macfarlane.

Child sexual abuse
Alice Hemmings reported allegations of sexual abuse dating from 1976 in The Sevenoaks Chronicle. The assault was reported to the Kent Police force by Stuart Neilson in 2012. Gerd Sommerhoff was also alleged to have displayed pornography to pupils and to have made obscene remarks including boasts of bestiality. Sevenoaks School agreed to settle a compensation claim by another pupil alleging sexual abuse by Gerd Sommerhoff at Sevenoaks School when he was 12 years old. According to the plaintiff's lawyer, Tracey Emmett, "Sommerhoff’s abuse may have been suspected by those who worked with him." Several further witnesses and victims have subsequently been identified, indicating that Gerd Sommerhoff was a preferential paedophile attracted to pubescent boys.

Works

References

Further reading

1915 births
2002 deaths
German neuroscientists
German humanists
Systems scientists
Schoolteachers from Kent
Academics of University College London
Fellows of Trinity College, Cambridge
People from Wiesbaden
People interned during World War II